Andrew Dwyer (born 4 November 1956) is a former English professional squash player.

Dwyer was born on 4 November 1956 and lived in Hove, Sussex. He started playing at Withdean and was capped by England in 1977. His greatest achievement was being part of the winning England team during the 1979 World Team Squash Championships, the last world amateur championship before the game went open.

References

External links
 

English male squash players
1956 births
Living people